Luke Weller (born 13 January 1982) is an Australian rules footballer who played with the Brisbane Lions and Richmond in the Australian Football League (AFL).

Weller, first rookie listed by the Lions since 2001, was promoted to the seniors during the 2003 AFL season when Anthony Corrie was put on the long term injury list. A key position player, he was used mainly as a defender in his four games that year.

Having been delisted by Brisbane, Weller was selected by Richmond in the 2004 Pre-season Draft, with pick 11. He played only seven league games for Richmond and then returned to his original Queensland club, the Zillmere Eagles.

He now plays in the West Australian Football League, for East Fremantle, who he joined in 2007. Weller won the 2010 Lynn Medal, as East Fremantle's best and fairest player.

References

1982 births
Australian rules footballers from Queensland
Brisbane Lions players
Richmond Football Club players
Zillmere Eagles Australian Football Club players
East Fremantle Football Club players
Living people
Aspley Football Club players